Asura bizonoides is a moth of the family Erebidae. It is found on Sumatra.

References

bizonoides
Moths described in 1862
Moths of Indonesia